is the debut single of the Japanese pop group Johnny's WEST. It was released on April 23, 2014. It reached number one on the Weekly Oricon Singles Chart. It was the 22nd best-selling single of the year in Japan, with 307,948 copies. On the theater performance of Naniwa Zamurai Hello Tokyo, the fans chose songs among 10-13 different songs, and through that Eejanaika was chosen.

Track listing

Chart

References

2014 songs
Billboard Japan Hot 100 number-one singles
Johnny's West songs
Oricon Weekly number-one singles